Dick Sahlén (born 10 November 1986 in Stockholm) is a Swedish auto racing driver who has competed in the Scandinavian Touring Car Championship for Mattias Ekström Juniorteam.

Swedish motorsport people
1986 births
Living people
Sportspeople from Stockholm